Look! Here Comes Our Fighters is a World War I song written and composed by Anne W. Stimson. The song was first published in 1918 by R.W. Heffelfinger Co., in Los Angeles, CA. 
The sheet music cover depicts a bugler with troops marching in background framed within a shield.
The sheet music can be found at the Pritzker Military Museum & Library.

References 

Songs about soldiers
1918 songs
Songs of World War I